Abdel Kader Haiboui (Arabic: عبد القادر هيباوي; born March 11, 1979), better known as Kader Japonais, (Arabic: كادير الجابوني or قادر جابوني) is an Algerian Raï singer and production artist. He was born in the neighborhood of Bab-El-Oued, Algiers, Algeria. 

He gained fame in the 2000s for single "Jibou la Brigade" and again in the 2010s for singles "Nti Sbabi" and "Waalach." He sings and speaks in Algerian Arabic and sometimes in French or Eastern Arabic dialects. 

His music blends raï with chaabi, Arabic pop and other musical styles of the Maghreb. Kader's songs range from slow-paced sentimental love songs to fast-paced dance songs.

Kader remarked in interviews that he graduated with a law degree but was unsuccessful at finding employment at a practice, so he started singing to get himself out of dire poverty.

The use of "Japonais" in his stage name means Japanese, and it was originally a nickname he received for due to his eyes, which seem to have an epicanthic fold perceived to be similar to Japanese people. Early in his career, Kader decided to keep this nickname and incorporate it to become his official stage name.

At the age of 18, he had performed at nightclubs in Algiers, then in other Algerian towns such as Oran and Constantine. 

Later he participated in international music festivals within the Maghreb, at events in Timgad, Sidi Bel Abbès, Djemila, Alger, at the Mawazine festival in Rabat, Oujda, and Casablanca, at the Khiwa festival in Hammamet, at the Kasserine festival, and the World Festival of Black Arts in Senegal. 

Outside of Africa, he received attention in France during his annual performances at the Zénith de Paris for la nuit du Raï and at the festival du Raï in Toulouse as well as for the festival du Monde Arabe in Montreal.

Collaborations 
Among the collaborations of Kader Japonais with other artists were those with Cheb Nasro, Rim'K of 113 (on "On reste fiers"), Lartiste, DJ Hamida, DJ Kayz, DJ Kim, L'Algerino, Kayline, Zina Daoudia.

Singles 

 Jibou la brigade ou zidou central
 Nti Sbabi
 Waalach
 On reste fiers (with Rim-K)
 Ehki ya zman

Albums 

 2001 : first album
 2006 : La brigade (Dounia)
 2008 : Mania (Dounia)
 2009 : Haba Haba (Dounia)
 2010 : Bafana Bafana (Dounia)
 2011 : Blèbik, Mamamia (Dounia)
 2012 Ndir El Courage, Adabek Nti Bizarre
 2013 : Djarhi ma bra' (Dounia)
 2014 : Bassik m"aya (Villa Prod)
 2015 : Mami Mami (Villa Prod)
 2016 : Hkaya (Villa Prod)
 2017 Raki Nedmana
 2018 : Holm (Villa Prod)

References

External links 

 

Living people
Raï musicians
Folk-pop singers
1979 births
Musicians  from Algiers
21st-century Algerian  male  singers